The Sălătruc is a right tributary of the river Someș in Romania. It discharges into the Someș in Coplean.

References

Rivers of Romania
Rivers of Cluj County